Reelin' with the Feelin' is an album by organist Charles Kynard which was recorded in 1969 and released on the Prestige label.

Reception

Allmusic awarded the album 4½ stars stating "From the title track, we gather this session is a blast of hard funk and groove where the blues are all built into shuffles and strolls and distorted by electricity -- Kynard's organ is so overloaded in the mix it's hard at times to tell what instrument he's playing, he's kickin' it that hard".

Track listing 
All compositions by Richard Fritz except as indicated
 "Reelin' with the Feelin'" - 7:15  
 "Soul Reggae" (Carol Kaye) - 4:56  
 "Slow Burn" - 6:33  
 "Boogalooin'" - 6:23  
 "Be My Love" (Nicholas Brodszky, Sammy Cahn) - 6:19  
 "Stomp" (Wilton Felder) - 5:07

Personnel 
Charles Kynard - organ
Wilton Felder - tenor saxophone
Joe Pass - guitar
Carol Kaye - electric bass
Paul Humphrey - drums
Richard Fritz - arranger (tracks 1 & 3-6)

References 

Charles Kynard albums
1969 albums
Prestige Records albums
Albums produced by Bob Porter (record producer)